Paul-Émile may refer to:

Paul-Émile Allard (1920–1995), Canadian provincial politician
Paul Émile Appell (1855–1930), French mathematician, Rector of the University of Paris
Paul-Émile Bécat (1885–1960), French painter, printmaker and engraver, awarded first prize in the Prix de Rome in 1920
Paul Émile Berthon (1846–1909), French landscape painter
Paul-Emile Bibeault (1919–1970), ice hockey goaltender
Paul Emile Biyaga (born 1987), Cameroonian football striker
Paul-Émile Lecoq de Boisbaudran (1838–1912), French chemist who discovered gallium, samarium and dysprosium
Paul-Émile Borduas (1905–1960), Québec painter known for his abstract paintings
Paul-Émile Botta (1802–1870), Italian-born French scientist, Consul in Mosul, discovered the ruins of Dur-Sharrukin
Paul-Émile Boutigny (1853–1929), French painter who specialized in military subjects
Paul Émile Chabas (1869–1937), French painter and illustrator and member of the Académie des Beaux-Arts
Paul Emile Chappuis (1816–1887), photographer, an inventor and manufacturer of daylight reflectors
Paul-Émile Charbonneau (1922–2014), Canadian Prelate of Roman Catholic Church
Benoît Paul Émile Clapeyron (1799–1864), French engineer and physicist, one of the founders of thermodynamics
Paul-Émile Côté (1909–1970), Liberal party member of the House of Commons of Canada
Paul-Émile Dalpé (1919–1994), C.M., Canadian labour unionist and nurse
Paul Emile Diou (1855–1914), French general
Paul Émile Gallant (1944–2011), Canadian entrepreneur who developed three-dimensional jigsaw puzzles
Paul-Émile Janson (1872–1944), francophone Belgian liberal politician and Prime Minister (1937–1938)
Jean-François-Paul-Emile d'Oultremont (1679–1737), Count of Oultremont and of the Holy Roman Empire, Baron of Han-sur-Lesse
Paul-Émile Lamarche (1881–1918), lawyer and political figure in Quebec
Paul-Émile Léger CC GOQ GCM PSS (1904–1991), Canadian Cardinal of the Roman Catholic Church
Paul-Émile d'Entremont, Canadian documentary filmmaker, known for his 2012 film about LGBT refugees, Last Chance
Paul Émile de Puydt (1810–1891), a writer whose contributions included work in botany and economics
Paul Emile Rousseau (1929–2001), car dealer and political figure in Saskatchewan, Canada
Pierre Paul Émile Roux FRS (1853–1933), French physician, bacteriologist and immunologist
Paul-Emile Saadé (born 1933), Emeritus Maronite Eparch of the Maronite Catholic Eparchy of Batroun
Paul-Émile Sauvageau (1918–2003), Canadian politician
Paul-Émile de Souza (1930–1999), Beninese army officer and political figure
Paul-Émile Victor (1907–1995), French ethnologist and explorer

See also
Prix Paul-Émile-Borduas, award by the Government of Quebec that is part of the Prix du Québec, given to individuals who are artists or craftsman in the fields of visual arts, of the trades of art, architecture and the design
French Polar Institute Paul-Emile Victor, the organization leading the French National Antarctic Program since 1992